The 2200-meter or 136 kHz band is the lowest frequency band in which amateur radio operators are licensed to transmit. It was formally allocated to amateurs at the 2007 World Radiocommunication Conference (WRC-07). The band is available on a secondary basis in all ITU regions with the limitation that amateur stations have maximum radiated power of 1 watt effective isotropic radiated power.

The 2200-meter band is within the low frequency (LF) band, just below the 153–279 kHz longwave broadcast band.

History

The International Telecommunication Union's 2007 World Radiocommunication Conference (WRC-07) in Geneva agreed a secondary allocation of 135.7–137.8 kHz to the Amateur Service on Friday 9 November 2007. Prior to the ITU formal allocation some countries did have access or predecessors. For example, in the UK, operation on the even lower frequency of 73 kHz had been allowed from 1996 until 2003. A small number of countries also have limited license-exempt use (LowFER).

International frequency allocation
A number of European countries have already allocated the 135.7–137.8 kHz band to amateur radio use based on CEPT / ERC Recommendation 62-01 E ("Use of the band 135.7–137.8 kHz by the Amateur Service", Mainz 1997). The allocation is on a secondary basis, with a maximum ERP of 1 W. Otherwise the band 130–148.5 kHz is allocated on a primary base to the Maritime Mobile Service and the Fixed Service. The main users are naval one-way transmissions and radio-location systems.

Technical issues
Such low frequency transmissions require specialized equipment – usually custom made. In countries where it is allowed, maximum radiated power is usually limited to 1 watt (0 dBW or 30 dBm), but even this can be extremely difficult to achieve from practical equipment and antennas. Reception also poses problems due to considerable natural and man-made noise and interference (QRN and QRM).

Many users and experimenters have settled on extremely slow, computer-generated and displayed Morse code as the most common transmission mode.  This mode is known as QRSS, where the doubling of the 'S' emphasises the extreme slowness. (The international Q code QRS means "Please send more slowly", or "slow Morse" in radio jargon.)

Band plan
The 2005 IARU Region 1 Conference defined the band as follows:
135.7–136.0 kHz Station Tests and transatlantic reception window
136.0–137.4 kHz Telegraphy
137.4–137.6 kHz Non-Telegraphy digital modes
137.6–137.8 kHz Very slow telegraphy centred on 137.7 kHz

United States
In a Report and Order dated 27 March 2017, the FCC announced that amateur radio operators holding a General-class license or above would be allowed privileges on the 2200 m band with an ERP of 1 W, in accordance with the 2012 World Radiocommunication Conference (WRC-12).

On 15 September 2017 the Federal Communications Commission announced that all of the part 97 Amateur Radio Service rules adopted in WRC-12 / FCC 17–33 would now be in effect. It also reminded users that they needed to coordinate with the UTC out of concern for interference with Power Line Carrier systems.

Previously, in 1998, the FCC rejected an ARRL petition for LF allocations at 135.7–137.8 kHz and 160–190 kHz. In 2002, indications from the FCC had been that 136 kHz privileges would be authorized soon. On 14 May 2003, however, the FCC declined to grant these privileges citing concerns over potential interference with power line communications (PLC) systems operating unlicensed under Part 15 which are used by electrical utilities to send control through the power grid. But the FCC added that amateurs wishing to experiment with 136 kHz communications may apply for a Part 5 Experimental License  or operate under Part 15 regulations for this part of the electromagnetic spectrum. In the case of Part 15, the field strength measured 300 meters from the antenna may not exceed 2,400 microvolts per meter divided by the frequency in kilohertz, or approximately 17 μV/m.

On 19 November 2012, the FCC issued a Notice of Proposed Rulemaking  demonstrating intent to authorize the amateur service as a secondary user of the LF band between 135.7–137.8 kHz with a maximum EIRP of 1 watt. The notice seeks to reexamine the 2003 rejection citing the international allocation of the band in all ITU regions by WRC-07 and the lack of use by the primary allocation holders. The notice seeks further comment and empirical evidence regarding interference to PLC systems based on data collected by experimental licenses granted in the United States and by other stations around the world.

On 27 April 2015 the Federal Communications Commission announced a preliminary decision to permit amateur operation on a secondary basis from 135.7–137.8 kHz, at a maximum output of 1 watt EIRP.

Countries in which operation is permitted

Countries with a known band allocation 
 ITU region 1
Austria
Belgium
Bulgaria
Czech Republic
Denmark
Estonia
Finland
France
 Germany
 Greece
Hungary
Iceland
Ireland
Italy
Lithuania
Netherlands
Norway
Poland
Romania
Russia
Spain
Sweden
Switzerland
Turkey
Ukraine
United Kingdom

 ITU Region 2
Argentina
 Brazil: Brazilian amateurs received privileges on the band in August 2018.
 Canada: Canadian amateurs received privileges on the band in December 2009.
French Overseas Departments and Territories in Region 2 (135.7–137.8 kHz)
Overseas Departments:
French Guiana
Guadeloupe
Martinique
Overseas collectivities:
Saint Barthélemy
Saint Martin
Saint Pierre and Miquelon

 ITU Region 3
 Australia: The ACMA included the allocation of 135.7–137.8 kHz as a secondary service to Advanced License amateurs in the Australia RF Spectrum Plan which came into force on 1 January 2009.
 People's Republic of China: The Ministry of Industry and Information Technology included the allocation of 135.7–137.8 kHz as a secondary service for amateur radio in Mainland China, up to 1 W EIRP is permitted. However, no frequency allocation exists in Hong Kong or Macau Amateurs radio operators in Mainland China with Type-B or C privileges can use 135.7–137.8 kHz with 1 W EIRP.
 Taiwan: Following WRC-07, amateur radio is allocated as a secondary service within 135.7–137.8 kHz, up to 1 W EIRP is permitted in Taiwan. 
 Japan: Japanese Amateurs can use 135.7-137.8 kHz with 1 W EIRP as of 30 March 2009
 New Zealand: Amateurs are allowed to operate anywhere between 130 kHz and 190 kHz with a radiated power not exceeding 5 watts EIRP
 Philippines: Amateurs are allowed to operate between 135.7–137.8 kHz effective 30 August 2012

Countries with past or current experimental operation 
 United States: The Federal Communications Commission (FCC) permitted licensed amateurs to apply for special Part 5 experimental licenses in the band.

See also
 Amateur radio
 Amateur radio bands
 Low frequency
 LowFER
 List of amateur radio organizations
 List of amateur radio operating modes

References

Amateur radio bands